Miletus zinckenii is a butterfly in the family Lycaenidae. It is found on Java and Borneo.

Subspecies
 Miletus zinckenii zinckenii (Java)
 Miletus zinckenii improbus (H. H. Druce, 1896) (Borneo)

References

Butterflies described in 1865
Miletus (butterfly)
Butterflies of Borneo
Butterflies of Java
Taxa named by Baron Cajetan von Felder
Taxa named by Rudolf Felder